Michael "Misha" Novakhov is an American radio host and politician who serves as a member of the New York State Assembly from the 45th district. Prior to being elected, he worked as a host on the Russian-language radio station FreedomFM.

Personal life 
Novakhov described that he was "born under Communist rule within the former USSR" and that "his father was fortunate enough to escape along with Michael and the rest of his family to America". According to a bio on the FreedomFM website, his Soviet passport showed "Baku" as his place of birth and "Ukrainian" as his nationality, indicating that he has at least one ethnic Ukrainian parent. In an interview with the Jewish Press, he called himself a "secular Jew".

He lives in Manhattan Beach, Brooklyn.

Career 
According to his campaign website, Novakov worked in the radio business since 2003. In 2019, he opened "Freedom FM", a Russian-language radio station in Brooklyn where he served as a host.

In the November 2022, Novakhov defeated incumbent assemblyman Steven Cymbrowitz by 19 percentage points.

Electoral history

References 

Living people
Republican Party members of the New York State Assembly
21st-century American politicians
Year of birth missing (living people)
Politicians from Baku
Soviet emigrants to the United States
American radio hosts